The Shinty–Hurling International Series is a sports competition played annually between the Ireland national hurling team (selected by the Gaelic Athletic Association) and Scotland national shinty team (selected by the Camanachd Association). The series is conducted according to the rules of shinty–hurling, which is a hybrid sport consisting of a mixture of rules from the Scottish sport of shinty and the Irish sport of hurling.

Matches are played at men's senior, men's under 21 and women's levels, with Scotland having had the most success in recent years, winning the last five senior series.

History
The first known international fixture between a Scottish shinty team and Irish hurling team occurred in 1896, when the London Camanchd and London GAA local clubs met in a friendly. The following year, the first official series featuring an amalgamation of rules from both sports, occurred at Celtic Park in Scotland between Glasgow Cowal and Dublin Celtic. International tests between all-Scotland and all-Ireland teams were played intermittently prior to World War II. There were several attempts to establish regular meetings dating back to the Tailteann Games in 1928. However, anti-British sentiment within the GAA prevented a formalised series from occurring until the 1970s. It was not until 2003 that the Camanachd Association and the Gaelic Athletic Association committed to a yearly series, though in recent years the series has been changed from a single test series to a two test aggregate points series.

In 2013, a sport, known as Iomain, which incorporates a stick that is created specifically for the hybrid game, was trialled at Croke Park, with a view to it being introduced as a replacement for the current series. Currently, the scoring system operates as follows:
 Goal = 3 points
 Over = 2 points (if struck from a free or from more than 65 metres)
 Over = 1 point (from general run of play)

Results

Men

Women
The women's game is also referred to as shinty–camogie. The following is an incomplete table of recent results (missing results from 2011 to 2013).

2003 Oct 25  Ireland 5–9  Scotland 1–13 Inverness
2004 Oct 16  Ireland 3–10  Scotland 4–7 Ratoath
2005 Oct 8  Scotland 4–8  Ireland 2–11 Bught Park, Inverness
2006 Nov 9  Scotland 2–13  Ireland 2–5 Croke Park,
2007 Oct 13  Scotland 4–10  Ireland 0–11 An Aird, Fort William
2008 Oct 18  Scotland 1–10  Ireland 1–9 Nowlan Park,
2009 Oct 31  Ireland 2–2  Scotland 0–0 Bught Park, Inverness
2010 Oct 30 Ireland 6–9 Scotland 2–2 Ratoath
2014 Oct 28 Scotland 4–2 (12) def. Ireland 1–6 (9)

All-time standings

Men

See also
 Composite rules shinty–hurling
 Ireland national hurling team
 Scotland national shinty team
 International Rules Series

References

External links
 2010 Series First Test – from YouTube

Hurling
Shinty
Foreign relations of Scotland
Gaelic games in Scotland
Ireland–United Kingdom relations